Haaseidae is a family of millipedes belonging to the order Chordeumatida. Adult millipedes in this family range from 4.5 mm to 12 mm in length and have either 28 or 30 segments (counting the collum as the first segment and the telson as the last). For example, Orobainosoma hungaricum orientale, a subspecies of Haasea hungarica, has only 28 segments in adults rather than the 30 usually found in chordeumatidan adults, with only 46 pairs of legs in adult females and only 44 pairs of walking legs in adult males (excluding two pairs of gonopods).

Genera:
 Deuterohaasea Verhoeff, 1898
 Haasea Verhoeff, 1895
 Heterohaasea
 Hylebainosoma Verhoeff, 1899
 Rhopalogona Silvestri, 1898
 Romanosoma Ceuca, 1967
 Xiphogona Cook & Collins, 1895
 Xylophageuma Verhoeff, 1911

References

Chordeumatida